Akşar can refer to:

 Akşar, Acıpayam
 Akşar, Bayburt
 Akşar, Şenkaya

See also
 Aksar, a 2006 Indian Hindi-language drama thriller film